Clavus obliquicostatus is a species of sea snail, a marine gastropod mollusk in the family Drilliidae.

Description
The length of the shell attains 33 mm. The longitudinal ribs are oblique, narrow, a little waved, obtusely pointed on the periphery.  A few revolve astride at the base of the body whorl. The shell is yellowish white, spotted and maculated with chestnut.

Distribution
This marine species occurs off New Caledonia and Papua New Guinea
.

References

  Kilburn R.N., Fedosov A. & Kantor Yu.I. (2014) The shallow-water New Caledonia Drilliidae of genus Clavus Montfort, 1810 (Mollusca: Gastropoda: Conoidea). Zootaxa 3818(1): 1–69

External links
 
 Syntype in the MNHN, Paris

obliquicostatus
Gastropods described in 1845